The Gürzenich Orchestra Cologne is a German symphony orchestra based in Cologne.  On some recordings, the orchestra goes under the name "Gürzenich-Orchester Kölner Philharmoniker". Its name comes from its past principal concert venue, the Gürzenich concert hall in Cologne.  Currently, its primary concert venue is the Kölner Philharmonie.

History
The Gürzenich Orchestra traces its origins to 1827, when a group of Cologne Bürger sponsored the creation of the "Cölner Concert-Gesellschaft" (Cologne Concert Society) to set up "Gesellschaftskonzerte" (Society concerts) and "Abonnementskonzerte" (subscription concerts).  The orchestra began to give concerts at the Gürzenich concert hall in 1857, from which it derived its current name.  In 1986, the orchestra took up residence at the Kölner Philharmonie.  The orchestra also plays in opera productions in the Cologne Opera.

The current Generalmusikdirektor (GMD) of the city of Cologne, which includes the post of Gürzenich-Kapellmeister, is François-Xavier Roth, since 1 September 2015.  Roth's initial contract was for 5 years.   In October 2018, the orchestra extended Roth's contract to 2022.  In September 2022, the city of Cologne announced that Roth is to stand down as Gürzenich-Kapellmeister  at the close of the 2024-2025 season.

Premieres
The world premieres performed by the Gürzenich Orchestra include the following works:
 Johannes Brahms, Double Concerto for Violin and Cello (1887)
 Gustav Mahler, Symphony No. 3 (in collaboration with the Städtischen Kapelle Krefeld, 1902)
 Gustav Mahler, Symphony No. 5 (1904)
 Max Reger, Variations and Fugue on a Theme by Hiller (1907)
 Richard Strauss, Don Quixote (1898)
 Richard Strauss, Till Eulenspiegel's Merry Pranks (1895)
 Bernd Alois Zimmermann, Sinfonia prosodica (1964)

Gürzenich-Kapellmeister 
 Conradin Kreutzer (1840–1842)
 Heinrich Dorn (1843–1849) 
 Ferdinand Hiller (1850–1884) 
 Franz Wüllner (1884–1902) 
 Fritz Steinbach (1903–1914) 
 Hermann Abendroth, GMD (1915–1934) 
 Eugen Papst (1936–1944) 
 Günter Wand, GMD (1945–1974) 
 Yuri Ahronovitch (1975–1986) 
 Marek Janowski (1986–1990) 
 James Conlon, GMD (1990–2002) 
 Markus Stenz, GMD (2003–2014)
 François-Xavier Roth, GMD (2015–present)

Recordings
The orchestra's discography includes several CDs for EMI Classics of the music of Alexander von Zemlinsky, conducted by James Conlon. Under their Conductor Emeritus Dmitri Kitayenko the orchestra recorded a number of complete cycles by the composers Shostakovitch, Prokofiev, and Tchaikowski. In October 2005, the Gürzenich Orchestra began to produce their own commercial CD recordings under the "GO live!" label. One unique feature of these recordings is that these are recordings of the orchestra's performances that same evening, made available within 5 minutes of the end of the concert for purchase by audience members. The "Live CDs" were stopped after Stenz's tenure, in favour of live streaming from the orchestra's website.

References

External links 
  

1827 establishments in Prussia
German symphony orchestras
Music in Cologne
Musical groups established in the 1820s